Imbricaria is a genus of sea snails, marine gastropod mollusk in the family Mitridae, the miters or miter snails.

Species
Species within the genus Imbricaria include:

 Imbricaria amoena (A. Adams, 1853)
 Imbricaria annulata (Reeve, 1844)
 Imbricaria armonica (T. Cossignani & V. Cossignani, 2005)
 Imbricaria astyagis  (Dohrn, 1860)
 Imbricaria bacillum (Lamarck, 1811)
 Imbricaria baisei (Poppe, Tagaro & R. Salisbury, 2009)
 Imbricaria bantamensis (Oostingh, 1939)
 Imbricaria bellulavaria (Dekkers, Herrmann, Poppe & Tagaro, 2014)
 Imbricaria cernohorskyi (Rehder & B. R. Wilson, 1975)
 Imbricaria cloveri (Cernohorsky, 1971)
 Imbricaria conularis Lamarck, 1811)
 Imbricaria flammea  (Quoy & Gaimard, 1833)
 Imbricaria flammigera (Reeve, 1844)
 Imbricaria fulgetrum (Reeve, 1844)
 Imbricaria hidalgoi (G. B. Sowerby III, 1913)
 Imbricaria hrdlickai (R. Salisbury, 1994)
 Imbricaria insculpta (A. Adams, 1853)
 Imbricaria interlirata (Reeve, 1844)
 Imbricaria intersculpta  (G. B. Sowerby II, 1870)
 Imbricaria kermadecensis (Cernohorsky, 1978)
 Imbricaria maui  (Kay, 1979)
 Imbricaria nadayaoi (Bozzetti, 1997)
 Imbricaria philpoppei (Poppe, Tagaro & R. Salisbury, 2009)
 Imbricaria polycincta (H. Turner, 2007)
 Imbricaria pretiosa (Reeve, 1844)
 Imbricaria pugnaxa (Poppe, Tagaro & R. Salisbury, 2009)
 Imbricaria ruberorbis (Dekkers, Herrmann, Poppe & Tagaro, 2014)
 Imbricaria rufilirata (A. Adams & Reeve, 1850)
 Imbricaria rufogyrata (Poppe, Tagaro & R. Salisbury, 2009)
 Imbricaria salisburyi (Drivas & Jay, 1990)
 Imbricaria tahitiensis (Herrmann & R. Salisbury, 2012)
 Imbricaria verrucosa (Reeve, 1845)
 Imbricaria yagurai (Kira, 1959)
 Imbricaria zetema  (Dekkers, Herrmann, Poppe & Tagaro, 2014)

Species brought into synonymy 
 Imbricaria bicolor: synonym of Scabricola bicolor (Swainson, 1824)
 Imbricaria carbonacea (Hinds, 1844): synonym of Imbricariopsis carbonacea (Hinds, 1844)
 Imbricaria conica Schumacher, 1817: synonym of  Imbricaria conularis (Lamarck, 1811)
 Imbricaria conovula: synonym of Imbricariopsis conovula (Quoy & Gaimard, 1833)
 Imbricaria conus: synonym of Pterygia conus (Gmelin, 1791) 
 Imbricaria filum (Wood, 1828): synonym of Scabricola bicolor (Swainson, 1824)
 Imbricaria olivaeformis (Swainson, 1821): synonym of Swainsonia olivaeformis (Swainson, 1821)
 Imbricaria porphyria Verco, 1896: synonym of Peculator porphyria (Verco, 1896)
 Imbricaria punctata (Swainson, 1821): synonym of Imbricariopsis punctata (Swainson, 1821)
 Imbricaria vanikorensis: synonym of Imbricariopsis vanikorensis (Quoy & Gaimard, 1833)

Distribution
Species from this genus can be found in the Indian Ocean along Chagos and Mauritius.

References 

 Sheppard, A (1984). The molluscan fauna of Chagos (Indian Ocean) and an analysis of its broad distribution patterns. Coral Reefs 3: 43-50

External links 
 Eurasia shells info 
 Schumacher C.F. (1817). Essai d'un nouveau système des habitations des vers testacés. Schultz, Copenghagen. iv + 288 pp., 22 pls.
 Swainson, W. (1820-1823). Zoological Illustrations, or, original figures and descriptions of new, rare, or interesting animals, selected chiefly from the classes of ornithology, entomology, and conchology, and arranged on the principles of Cuvier and other modern zoologists. London: Baldwin, Cradock & Joe; Strand: W. Wood. (Vol. 1-3): pl. 1-18 [1820 pl. 19-83 [1821] pl. 84-134 [1822] pl. 135-182 ]
  Fedosov A., Puillandre N., Herrmann M., Kantor Yu., Oliverio M., Dgebuadze P., Modica M.V. & Bouchet P. (2018). The collapse of Mitra: molecular systematics and morphology of the Mitridae (Gastropoda: Neogastropoda). Zoological Journal of the Linnean Society. 183(2): 253-337

 
Mitridae